Nyssicus mendosus is a species of beetle in the family Cerambycidae. It was described by Martins in 2005.

References

Elaphidiini
Beetles described in 2005